David Hopkins may refer to:
 David Hopkins (writer) (born 1977), American comic book writer and essayist
 David Hopkins (musician) (born 1971), American singer-songwriter
 David W. Hopkins (1897–1968), U.S. Representative from Missouri
 David Hopkins (cricketer) (born 1957), former English cricketer
 David R. Hopkins (1938–2017), American engineer, businessman, and politician
 David C. Hopkins, researcher of ancient history and near eastern archaeology

See also
 David Hopkin (born 1970), Scottish footballer